HMS Whitley (L23), ex-Whitby,  was a W-class destroyer of the British Royal Navy that saw service in the British campaign in the Baltic Sea against Bolshevik forces during the Russian Civil War and in the early months of World War II.

Construction and commissioning
Whitley was ordered as HMS Whitby on 9 December 1916 as part of the 10th Order of the 1916–1917 Naval Programme and was laid down by William Doxford & Sons at Sunderland in June 1917. When it was discovered that the name "Whitby" had mistakenly been written as "Whitley" when it was chosen for her, it was decided not to correct it, and she was launched as HMS Whitley, the first Royal Navy ship of the name, on 13 April 1918. She was completed on 11 October 1918, exactly one month before the conclusion of World War I, and commissioned on 14 October 1918.

Service history

1918–1939

After acceptance trials and work-ups, Whitley deployed in 1919 to the Baltic Sea, where she served in the British campaign against Bolshevik forces during the Russian Civil War. She returned from the Baltic in 1920. In 1921, she was decommissioned and placed in reserve at Rosyth, Scotland, as part of the 9th Destroyer Flotilla.

Whitley was recommissioned at Chatham on 4 December 1923 to serve with the 9th Destroyer Flotilla in the Atlantic Fleet. She recommissioned with a reserve crew on 23 November 1925.

Whitley commissioned at Portsmouth on 14 December 1928 for service with the 5th Destroyer Flotilla in the Atlantic Ocean. She recommissioned at Chatham on 8 May 1929 for service with the 1st Destroyer Flotilla in the Mediterranean Sea. She was reduced to reserve at the Nore on 30 June 1932, and paid into maintenance reserve at Rosyth on 28 October 1933.

In 1938, Whitley was selected for conversion to an anti-aircraft escort, and began conversion for her new role at Chatham Dockyard in August 1938. Her conversion was completed in October 1938 and she was recommissioned in 1939.

World War II
The United Kingdom entered World War II in September 1939, and that month Whitley  was assigned to duty escorting convoys in the North Sea along the east coast of Great Britain, which she continued through April 1940. While escorting Convoy FN 12 from the Thames Estuary to the Forth Estuary on 12 January 1940, she assisted in driving off a German air attack.

In May 1940, Whitley was transferred under the command of the Commander-in-Chief, Dover, and was placed at the disposal of the French Navy for operations in support of Allied ground operations in France and Belgium.

Notes

Bibliography
 
 
 
 
 
 
 
 
 
 
 
 
 
 

 

V and W-class destroyers of the Royal Navy
Ships built on the River Wear
1918 ships
World War I destroyers of the United Kingdom
World War II destroyers of the United Kingdom
Shipwrecks of Belgium
Maritime incidents in May 1940